Mirpur Khas is a city in Sindh, Pakistan.

Mirpur Khas may also refer to:
Mirpur Khas Division, an administrative unit of Sindh, Pakistan
Mirpur Khas District, a district of Sindh, Pakistan
Mirpur Khas railway station, a railway station in Pakistan

See also

 Mirpur (disambiguation)